This article provides a list of Slovak film directors.

A
 Vlado Adásek (Vladimír Adásek)

B
 Ivan Balaďa
 Vladimír Balco
 Pavol Barabáš
 Stanislav Barabáš
 Vladimír Bahna
 Peter Bebjak
 Paľo Bielik
 Juraj Bindzár
 Eva Borušovičová
 Jozef Budský

C

 Igor Ciel

D
 Gejza Dezorz
 Alois Ditrich

F
 Rudolf Ferko
 Ľudovít Filan
 Zita Furková

G 
 Pavel Gejdoš ml.
 Ján Gogál
 Eduard Grečner

H
 Dušan Hanák
 Robert Hardónyi
 Pavol Haspra
 Elo Havetta 
 Juraj Herz
 Jozef Heriban
 Peter Hledík
 Martin Hollý junior (born 1931)
 Miroslav Horňák

I
 Samuel Ivaška

J
 Juraj Jakubisko
 Július Jarábek
 Ondrej Jariabek

K
 Ján Kadár
 Vladimír Kavčiak
 Robert Kirchhoff
 Dušan Kodaj
 Ctibor Kováč
 Otakar Krivánek
 Jakub Kroner
 František Kudláč

L
 Ján Lacko
 Leopold Lahola
 Andrej Lettrich
 Juraj Lihosit
 Miloslav Luther
 Štefan Lux

M
 Oleg Makara
 Anton Majerčík
 Julius Matula
 Jozef Medveď
 Matej Mináč

N
 Juraj Nvota

P

 Stanislav Párnický 
 Vladislav Pavlovič 
 Roman Petrenko 
 Ján Piroh Dimitrij Plichta

R
 Dušan Rapoš 
 Ivan Reitman
 Jozef Režucha

S

 Štefan Semjan 
 Jaroslav Siakeľ (Slovak-American)
 Laura Siváková
 Miroslav Šindelka 
 Marko Škop
 Jozef Slovák
 Peter Solan
 Martin Šulík
 Katarína Šulajová
 Eva Štefankovičová
 Vladimír Štric

T
 Dušan Trančík
 Martin Ťapák

U
 Štefan Uher

V
 Martin Valent 
 Jaroslav Vojtek

Z
 Zoro Záhon (Zoroslav Záhon)
 Jozef Zachar
 Ján Zeman
 František Žáček

Slovak women film directors

 Mira Fornay
 Iveta Grófová
 Zuzana Liová
 Tereza Nvotová
 Zuzana Piussi

Bibliography
 Václav Macek, Jelena PaStéková: Dejiny slovenskej kinematografie. Vydavatel’stvo Osveta, 1997.
 Renata Smatláková, Martina Smatlák: Filmové profily, slovenský reziséri hraných filmov (Film Profiles, Slovak Feature Film Directors). Slovenský filmový ústav, 2005.
 Pavol Branko: Straty a nálezy. Slovenkský filmový ústav, 2005.
 Stefan VraStiak, Marianna Forrayová, Rudolf Urc: Slovenský animovaný film. Slovenský filmový ústav, 1996.

Notes

See also
 Cinema of Slovakia

Film directors
 
Slovak